Cancelos de Baixo is a hamlet of Portugal, in the district of Guarda and the town of Mêda.

Agriculture

Agriculture is the principal activity in Cancelos de Baixo, including many vineyards. The area produces excellent wine, including varieties of Port (Oporto), as well as traditional red and white wines.
In addition, there are olive groves and several types of seasonal farming, such as corn and potatoes, as well as horticultural products (flowers, trees, etc.)

Historical Sites
 Capela Santo António de Cancelos de Baixo
 Fonte do Cancelos de Baixo

Principal streets
 Rua Direita
 EN 324

Trade

Trade does not play a significant role in the economy of Cancelos. There are only the following enterprises:
 The coffee processing company Almeida, which also operates a grocery store.
 The grocer, Francisco.
 A factory which produces windows.

Climate

 In spring the temperature averages 25° to 35 °C.
 In summer the temperature averages 38° to 40 °C.
 With the arrival of autumn the temperature drops to 15° to 25 °C.
 In the winter it ranges from -4° to 10 °C.

Populated places in Guarda District

fr:Cancelos do Meio